Salamat Metro Station is a station of Mashhad Metro Line 2. The station is currently under construction.

References

//
//

Mashhad Metro stations
Railway stations opened in 2018
2018 establishments in Iran